Craig Taylor may refer to:

 Craig Taylor (footballer) (born 1974), English footballer
 Craig Taylor (writer) (born 1976), Canadian writer
 Craig Taylor (fl. 2000s), American musician in Lydia
 Craig Taylor (American football) (born 1966), former American football running back
 C. M. Taylor (born 1972), English writer
 S. Craig Taylor (1946–2012), American game designer